Anthony "Tony" Morrell (born 3 May 1962) is a male retired English middle-distance runner.

Athletics career
Morrell won the bronze medal in the 1500 metres at the 1990 European Athletics Indoor Championships. In addition, he represented Great Britain at the 1987 World Championships and 1987 World Indoor Championships. He represented England in the 1,500 metres event, at the 1990 Commonwealth Games in Auckland, New Zealand.

International competitions

Personal bests
Outdoor
800 metres – 1:44.59 (Oslo 1988)
1000 metres – 2:16.99 1988)
1500 metres – 3:34.1 (Oslo 1990)
One mile – 3:51.31 (Oslo 1990)
Indoor
600 metres – 1:17.69 (Cosford 1987)
800 metres – 1:45.72 (Gent 1988)
1000 metres – 2:19.25 (Cosford 1988)
1500 metres – 3:38.70 (San Sebastián 1990)

References

All-Athletics profile

1962 births
Living people
Sportspeople from Hartlepool
English male middle-distance runners
Athletes (track and field) at the 1990 Commonwealth Games
Commonwealth Games competitors for England